Alexandra Isles ( Alexandra Cornelia Moltke; born February 11, 1946) is a documentary filmmaker and former actress. She is best-known for her role as the original Victoria Winters from 1966 to 1968 on the gothic TV serial Dark Shadows.

Background
Alexandra Cornelia Moltke was born in Uppsala, Sweden on February 11, 1946, of Danish and American parentage, the elder of two daughters, to Count Carl Adam Moltke, son of Count Carl Moltke, and Countess Mab Moltke (née Wilson; formerly Wright). Count Moltke was a permanent member of the Danish Mission to the United Nations, and Countess Moltke was an editor at Vogue.

Through her American grandmother, Cornelia Van Rensselaer Thayer, Alexandra and her younger sister, Victoria, are descended from the Livingston, Schuyler, Bayard and Van Rensselaer families.

Career
In 1985, she began work at the Museum of Television & Radio where she became a curator specializing in arts, drama and children's programming. In 1991, a grant from the National Endowment for the Humanities launched her on a career as a producer and director of the award-winning documentaries The Power of Conscience: The Danish Resistance and Rescue of the Jews (1995); Scandalize My Name: Stories from the Blacklist (1999); Porraimos: Europe's Gypsies in the Holocaust (2002); The Healing Gardens of New York (2006); and Hidden Treasures: Stories from a Great Museum (2011). Her films have been seen at the United States Holocaust Memorial Museum (Washington, DC), Museum of Modern Art (NY), and numerous film festivals including the Human Rights Watch and Margaret Mead Film Festivals, and all have aired on PBS.
Currently she works at the Metropolitan Museum as a Volunteer Educator.

Personal life
In 1967, she married Philip Henry Isles II of the Lehman banking family at the Madison Avenue Presbyterian Church in Manhattan. She left Dark Shadows in 1968 due to pregnancy. In 1969, she gave birth to a son, Adam.

She was the mistress of Claus von Bulow and testified at his 1982 and 1985 trials for the attempted murder of his wife, Sunny von Bülow.

In 1985 she began work at the Museum of Television & Radio (now the Paley Center for Media), and became an Assistant Curator, working on exhibitions and screening series on the arts and children's programming. In 1991, with a grant from the National Endowment for the Humanities, she produced and directed Scandalize My Name, Stories from the Blacklist, introduced by Morgan Freeman and featuring Harry Belafonte, Ossie Davis and Rosetta Le Noire. That same year she married a physician, Dr. Alfred Jaretzki III.

Her subsequent documentary films were The Power of Conscience: The Danish Resistance and Rescue of the Jews; Porraimos: Europe's Gypsies in the Holocaust; The Healing Gardens of New York; Hidden Treasures: Stories from a Great Museum; and Harry's Gift: A New York Story.

References

External links

1946 births
American people of Danish descent
American people of Dutch descent
American television actresses
Alexandra Isles
Alexandra Isles
Alexandra Isles
Living people
Alexandra Isles
Alexandra Isles
Alexandra Isles
Alexandra Isles